Dance of Ganesha, also known as Naach Ganesh is a 2011, Indian short film  directed by Bikas Ranjan Mishra, and produced by Pankaj Dubey. The film had its world premiere at the 16th Busan International Film Festival.

Plot
A tribal dancer is caught in his daily struggle of survival in an automobile factory. The burden to earn a living for his family and preserve his family tradition of ritual Ganesha dancing is humongous. His two roles, as a bread winner for his two kids, a wife and an ailing father and as the magnificent elephant god Ganesha, is so diverse that his journey from factory to village looks almost like time travel and his existence schizophrenic! Ganesha, the dancer lives in the perpetual fear of the day when he will have to make a choice between livelihood and art/tradition.

References

External links
 

2011 films
2010s Hindi-language films
Films shot in India